Keiko is a feminine Japanese given name. Keikō (景行), with a long "o", is the name posthumously given to Emperor Keikō.

Possible meanings
As with many Japanese names, Keiko can be written using a number of different kanji.  Some of the most common ways of writing Keiko (and the most representative meanings of the respective kanji) are:
 恵子 — "lucky child"
 敬子 — "respectful child"
 景子 — "sunlight/view/scenic child"
 桂子 — "katsura tree child"
 圭子 — "blessed child" 
 慶子 — "happy child"
 啓子 — "open (one's eyes)/express/spring (season) child"
 硅子 — "silicon child"

The suffix ko (子) implies the name is female and the name is almost never given to males. Much less commonly, Keiko can also be written as 螢子, 輕子, or 軽子.

People with the name
 Keiko Abe, 安倍 圭子 a Japanese composer and percussionist 
 Keiko Agena, an American actress
, Japanese speed skater
 Keiko Chiba (千葉 景子), a politician and former justice minister of Japan
 Keiko Fukuda (福田 敬子, 1913-2013), a Japanese-born American martial artist
 Keiko Fuji (藤 圭子, 1951-2013), a Japanese enka singer, actress, and mother of Hikaru Utada
 Keiko Fujimori (藤森 恵子), a Peruvian congresswoman and former first lady
Keiko Fukuda, judoka
 Keiko Han (潘 恵子), a Japanese voice actress and western astrologer
, Japanese speed skater
, Japanese sport shooter
 Mazie Keiko Hirono (広野 慶子), an American politician and the junior United States senator from Hawaii
 Keiko Ihara (井原 慶子), a Japanese race car driver
, Japanese poet
 Keiko Kitagawa (北川 景子), a Japanese model/actress
 Keiko Kubota (窪田啓子), a Japanese singer and a member of the J-pop groups FictionJunction and Kalafina
 Keiko Masuda (増田恵子), member of the J-pop duo Pink Lady
 Keiko Matsui (松居慶子), a Japanese pianist and composer
 Keiko Miura (三浦恵子), a Japanese field hockey athlete
, Japanese women's basketball player
 Keiko Nobumoto, (信本敬中) a Japanese screenwriter the creator of Wolf's Rain
, Japanese long-distance runner
, Japanese sailor
 Keiko Takemiya (竹宮 惠子), a Japanese manga artist
 Keiko Takeshita (竹下景子), a Japanese actress
 Keiko Toda (戸田 恵子), a Japanese actress
, Japanese botanist
 Keiko Utoku (宇徳敬子), a Japanese singer/songwriter
 Keiko Yamada (山田 桂子), a Japanese singer and lead vocalist of the J-pop band Globe
 Keiko Yamada (manga artist) (山田 圭子), a Japanese manga artist
, Japanese voice actress
Keiko Yokozawa (born 1952), Japanese voice actress
 Keiko Kubota (窪田啓子), a Japanese singer

Fictional characters
 Keiko Arahida, a recurring character played by Yūko Takeuchi in the 2009 TV series FlashForward
 Keiko Hasegawa, a main character in the webcomic Okashina Okashi – Strange Candy
 Keiko Katou, a character from the anime media franchise Strike Witches
 Keiko O'Brien, a character from Star Trek: The Next Generation and Star Trek: Deep Space Nine
 Keiko Onuki, also Keiko Inoue, a character in the novel and film Battle Royale
 Keiko Makino, a character from the manga The Kurosagi Corpse Delivery Service.
 Keiko Yukimura, a character from the manga and anime series Yu Yu Hakusho
 Keiko Nekton, a character from the graphic novel The Deep: Here Be Dragons and the following TV series The Deep.
 Keiko Ayano, game name Silica, from the light novel, anime and manga media franchise Sword Art Online.

Animals
 Keiko (orca), the orca, or killer whale, which performed in the film Free Willy

See also
Japanese names
Japanese writing system
Svetlana, an equivalent Slavic name

References

Japanese feminine given names